Papadopoulos (meaning "son of a priest") is the most common Greek surname. It is used in Greece, Cyprus and countries of the Greek diaspora as well, such as the USA, United Kingdom, Australia and Scandinavian countries. Its female version corresponds to the masculine genitive Papadopoulou.

Men 
 Antonios Papadopoulos (born 1999), German footballer of Greek descent
 Avraam Papadopoulos (born 1984), Greek footballer
 Daniil Papadopoulos (born 1963), Greek footballer
 Dimitris Papadopoulos (born 1950), Greek footballer
 Dimitris Papadopoulos (born 1981), Greek footballer
 Dimitris Papadopoulos (basketball player) (born 1966), Greek basketball player
 Dimitrios Papadopoulos (general) (1889–1983), Greek general in World War II
 Efthimios Papadopoulos (born 1983), Greek runner
 Evgenios Papadopoulos, Greek sprinter
 Georgios Papadopoulos (1919–1999), Greek military officer and dictator in 1967–1973
 George Papadopoulos (born 1987), former policy adviser for the Donald Trump presidential campaign, 2016
 Giannis Papadopoulos (footballer, born 1989), Greek footballer
 Giannis Papadopoulos (footballer, born 1998), Greek footballer
 Giorgos Papadopoulos (footballer, born 1991), Cypriot footballer
 Giorgos Papadopoulos (singer) (born 1985), Cypriot singer
 Giuseppe Papadopulo (born 1948), Italian football manager
 Greg Papadopoulos (born 1958), American engineer, computer scientist, executive, and venture capitalist, former CTO of Sun Microsystems
 Ioannis Papadopoulos (chess player) (born 1988), Greek chess player
 Kyriakos Papadopoulos (born 1992), Greek footballer
 Lazaros Papadopoulos (born 1980), Greek basketball player
 Lefteris Papadopoulos (born 1935), Greek lyricist and journalist
 Manolis Papadopoulos (born 1968), Greek footballer
 Michal Papadopulos (born 1985), Czech footballer of Greek descent
 Nikolaos Papadopoulos, several people of that name
 Panagiotis Papadopoulos, Greek wrestler
 Panos Papadopulos (1920–2001), German actor of Pontic Greek origin
 Panos Papadopoulos (born 1958), Greek-Swedish designer and entrepreneur
 Stephanos Papadopoulos (born 1976), Greek-American poet and translator
 Tassos Papadopoulos (1934–2008), 5th President of Cyprus in 2003–2008
 Theologis Papadopoulos (born 1960), Greek footballer
 Vitali Papadopulo (born 1963), Russian footballer and manager
 Yiannis Papadopoulos (guitarist) (born 1984), Greek guitarist

Women 
Irena Papadopoulos, Greek Cypriot academic
Stiliani Papadopoulou (born 1982), Greek hammer thrower
Linda Papadopoulos (born 1971), British-Canadian psychologist and media commentator

In fiction 
Algernon Papadopoulos, a character in the video game Bully
Aristotle Papadopoulos, the main antagonist of the film The Hitman's Wife's Bodyguard.
Lester Papadopoulos, Apollo's human name in The Trials of Apollo by Rick Riordan
Bernard Papadopoulos - Bernard is the Scottish character and the voice of reason in a crazy world of the animated series Transportation Station from Hooting Pictures, he is voiced by James Hare.
 Ernest Papadopoulos - Ernest is the snarky, procrastinating receptionist character of the animated series Transportation Station from Hooting Pictures, he is voiced by Josiah Christian Daniel.
 Bernice Papadopoulos - Bernice is the optimistic, bubbly pilot character of the animated series Transportation Station from Hooting Pictures, she is voiced by Millicent Basler.
 Ichika Papadopoulos - Ichika is the curious, adventurous daughter of Bernard Papadopoulos of the animated series Transportation Station from Hooting Pictures, she is voiced by Lumiere.

See also

Papadopol, the Romanian derivative and equivalent surname
Papadopoulos (biscuits), a Greek food company
Papadopoulos & Sons, a 2012 film directed by Marcus Markou
Papadopoli (disambiguation)

Greek-language surnames
Surnames
Occupational surnames